Karditsa railway station is a railway station that serves the city of Karditsa, Thessaly, Greece. Today Hellenic Train operates 11 daily Regional trains between Kalambaka, Athens, Thessaloniki, Larissa and Palaiofarsalos.

History
The station open 16 June 1886 by the Thessaly Railways. The original station building (and the line) was designed by the Italian Evaristo de Chirico, (father of Giorgio de Chirico), however, this building was removed and replaced with a newer building some years later. The line was authorised by the Greek government under the law AMH’/22.6.1882. soon after the liberation of Central Greece from the Ottomans.

After the First World War, the Greek state planned the ambitious construction of several new rail lines and links, including a standard gauge line from Kalambaka onto Kozani and then Veroia creating a conversion of the route from Volos to Kalambaka (though Karditsa) on standard gauge. In 1927, the relevant decisions were made; starting in 1928, work was carried out on the construction of the new line from Kalambaka. But a year later, it was clear that the project would exceed the estimated costs many times over. In 1932, the construction work was stopped and remains unfinished. In 1955 Thessaly Railways was absorbed into Hellenic State Railways (SEK).

Freight traffic declined sharply when the state-imposed monopoly of OSE for the transport of agricultural products and fertilisers ended in the early 1990s. Many small stations of the network with little passenger traffic were closed down, especially on the mainline section and between Karditsa and Kalampaka. In 2001 the section between Kalampaka and Palaiofarsalos was converted from Narrow gauge (1000 mm) to standard gauge (1435 mm) and physically connected at Palaiofarsalos with the mainline from Athens to Thessaloniki. Since to upgrade; however, travel times improved and the unification of rail gauge allowed direct services, even InterCity services, to link Volos and Kalambaka with Athens and Thessaloniki.

In 2001 the infrastructure element of OSE was created, known as GAIAOSE; it would henceforth be responsible for the maintenance of stations, bridges and other elements of the network, as well as the leasing and the sale of railway assists. In 2005, TrainOSE was created as a brand within OSE to concentrate on rail services and passenger interface. In 2009, with the Greek debt crisis unfolding OSE's Management was forced to reduce services across the network. Timetables were cut back and routes closed as the government-run entity attempted to reduce overheads. In 2015 a 15-year-old child was airlifted to hospital after being electrocuted at the station. In 2017 OSE's passenger transport sector was privatised as TrainOSE; currently, a wholly-owned subsidiary of Ferrovie dello Stato Italiane infrastructure, including stations, remained under the control of OSE. In July 2022, the station began being served by Hellenic Train, the rebranded TranOSE

Facilities
The Station has waiting rooms on platform 1. There is a footbridge via stairs or lift from platform 1 to platform 2/3. The station is staffed, with ticket purchasing facilities and toilets, with Luggage storage available.

Services
The station is currently served by Regional express trains between Athens, Thessaloniki and Larissa, with up to six trains daily in each direction.

Station layout

Gallery

External links

 https://www.gtp.gr/TDirectoryDetails.asp?id=77318&lng=2

References

Karditsa
Transport in Karditsa (regional unit)
Railway stations in Thessaly
Railway stations opened in 1886
Buildings and structures in Karditsa (regional unit)
Thessaly Railways